Flying dinosaur could refer to:

Animals
Pterosaurs, extinct non-dinosaurian flying reptiles
Archaeornithes, extinct primitive flying bird-like dinosaurs, e.g. Archaeopteryx
Neornithes, modern birds which are the only surviving dinosaurs
Scansoriopterygidae, an extinct family of climbing and gliding dinosaurs
Other (extinct) members of the clade Avialae, perhaps also other Maniraptorans

Other
The Flying Dinosaur, a roller coaster ride in Universal Studios Jurassic Park amusement park, Japan

See also 
Origin of birds
Flying dragon